Benjamin Girth (born 31 January 1992) is a German professional footballer who plays as a forward for MSV Duisburg.

Career
In June 2018, 2. Bundesliga side Holstein Kiel announced the signing of Girth from 3. Liga club SV Meppen on a three-year contract. In August 2022, after a year at Eintracht Braunschweig, he moved to MSV Duisburg.

Career statistics

References

External links

1992 births
Living people
Sportspeople from Magdeburg
German footballers
Association football forwards
RB Leipzig II players
VFC Plauen players
KSV Hessen Kassel players
SV Meppen players
Holstein Kiel players
Holstein Kiel II players
VfL Osnabrück players
Eintracht Braunschweig players
MSV Duisburg  players
2. Bundesliga players
3. Liga players
Regionalliga players
Footballers from Saxony-Anhalt